Olszowa may refer to the following places:
Olszowa, Lesser Poland Voivodeship (south Poland)
Olszowa, Łódź Voivodeship (central Poland)
Olszowa, Masovian Voivodeship (east-central Poland)
Olszowa, Greater Poland Voivodeship (west-central Poland)
Olszowa, Opole Voivodeship (south-west Poland)